The western emerald (Chlorostilbon melanorhynchus) is a species of hummingbird in the "emeralds", tribe Trochilini of subfamily Trochilinae. It is found in Colombia and Ecuador.

Taxonomy and systematics

The western emerald was originally described as a species and later treated as a subspecies of the blue-tailed emerald (Chlorostilbon mellisugus). Since the early 2000s the South American Classification Committee (SACC) of the American Ornithological Society, the International Ornithological Committee (IOC), and the Clements taxonomy have again treated it as a species in its own right. However, as of 2020 BirdLife International's Handbook of the Birds of the World (HBW) retained it as the C. mellisugus subspecies.

The IOC treats the western emerald as monotypic. The SACC and Clements recognize two subspecies, the nominate C. m. melanorhynchus and C. m. pumilus, though the SACC accepts that the latter "might not be recognizable". HBW treats melanorhynchus and pumilis as subspecies of blue-tailed emerald.

Description

Both sexes of both subspecies have a short black bill. The nominate male has an iridescent green forehead and crown with gold highlights, a bright green face, shining bronzy green upperparts, and a steel blue tail. Its underparts are glittering emerald green, with greater iridescence and a blue tinge on the breast. It has white thigh tufts. The female has a bronzy green forehead and crown and a blackish face with a pale gray spot behind the eye. The rest of its upperparts are metallic grass green and the tail is blue-black with white tips. Its underparts are pale gray to white with a buffy tone on the throat and belly. C. m. pumilus, when treated separately, differs only by having a slightly shorter bill and a brighter crown than the nominate.

Distribution and habitat

The western emerald is found from the Western Andes of Colombia south into Ecuador. C. m. melanorhynchus occurs in the upper subtropical zone of Colombia and the temperate zone in Ecuador. C. m. pumilus is found at lower elevations, in the arid and semi-arid tropical and subtropical zones.

The western emerald inhabits open to semi-open landscapes such as the edges and clearings of mature forest, plantations, cultivated areas and fields, and gardens.

Behavior

Movement

The western emerald is generally sedentary but might make limited seasonal elevational changes.

Feeding

The western emerald usually feeds at fairly low levels. Almost nothing else is known about its feeding strategy or diet because most observations are published as the blue-tailed emerald without distinguishing the subspecies.

Breeding

The western emerald's breeding season in Colombia appears to span from January to June. As is the case with feeding, most observations of its breeding phenology are published as the blue-tailed emerald without distinguishing the subspecies.

Vocalization

The western emerald's song is "a continuous series of subdued scratchy and wheezy notes... sometimes preceded by a few introductory notes, witsitsitsi...chirr..chirr..chirr..chirr.. or tsit-trr, tsit-trr, tsit-trr, tsit-trr...." Its calls include "a soft tsip, pit, and chwep."

Status

The IUCN follows HBW taxonomy and so has not assessed the western emerald separately from the blue-tailed emerald. It "[r]eadily accepts man-made habitat and is fairly common across its range."

References

western emerald
Birds of Colombia
Birds of Ecuador
Birds of the Tumbes-Chocó-Magdalena
western emerald
Taxonomy articles created by Polbot
Taxobox binomials not recognized by IUCN